The 2012 Premier League season was the second tier/division of British speedway.

Summary
The season took place between March and October 2012. The Glasgow Tigers were the defending champions after winning in 2011. 

Scunthorpe Scorpions won the league after beating Somerset Rebels in the play-offs by one point in the Grand Final.

Final league table

Play Offs

Group 1

Group 2

Scoring

Home draw = 1 point
Home win by any number of points = 3
Away loss by 6 points or less = 1
Away draw = 2
Away win by between 1 and 6 points = 3
Away win by 7 points or more = 4

Play Off final
First leg

Second leg

Scunthorpe were declared League Champions, winning on aggregate 92–91.

Premier League Knockout Cup
The 2012 Premier League Knockout Cup was the 45th edition of the Knockout Cup for tier two teams. Newcastle Diamonds were the winners of the competition.

First round

Quarter-finals

Semi-finals

Final
First leg

Second leg

Newcastle were declared Knockout Cup Champions, winning on aggregate 106–74.

Final Leading averages

Riders & final averages
Berwick

Ricky Ashworth 9.20
Sebastian Aldén 8.12 
Lee Complin 7.73
Robin Aspegren 7.59
Micky Dyer 6.72
David Bellego 5.95
Alex Edberg 5.77
Nicki Barrett 5.53
Luboš Tomíček Jr. 5.23
Jason King 3.70
Klaus Jakobsen 3.19

Edinburgh

Craig Cook 9.99 
Theo Pijper 8.28
Andrew Tully7.40
Matthew Wethers 7.04
Derek Sneddon 6.37
József Tabaka 5.95
Charles Wright 4.36
Micky Dyer 4.12
Marcel Helfer 3.86
James Sarjeant 1.60

Glasgow

Joe Screen 9.48 
Josh Grajczonek 7.78
James Grieves 7.61
Henning Bager 6.20
Mason Campton 5.52
Charles Wright 5.13
Robert Ksiezak 4.52
Filip Šitera 4.52
Jade Mudgway 3.58
Chris Mills 3.50
James McBain 2.62
Jayden O'Malley 2.19

Ipswich

Dakota North 7.80
Kevin Doolan 7.71
Leigh Lanham 7.67
Rohan Tungate 7.22
Morten Risager 7.19
Mathieu Trésarrieu 6.70
Cameron Heeps 5.92
Taylor Poole 4.90
Stefan Nielsen 4.32

Leicester

Kauko Nieminen 8.60
Lasse Bjerre 7.85
Magnus Karlsson 7.21
Linus Eklöf 6.83
Simon Nielsen 5.83
Jan Graversen 5.52
Jari Makinen 4.99
Simon Lambert 4.86
Lewis Blackbird 2.19

Newcastle

Richie Worrall 8.62
Stuart Robson 8.25
Mark Lemon 7.84
Ludvig Lindgren 7.62
Christian Henry 7.48
Claes Nedermark 7.33
Steve Worrall 5.41
Paul Starke 3.00

Plymouth

Ben Barker 10.05
Ryan Fisher 8.75
Cory Gathercole 6.88
Todd Kurtz 5.61
Nicki Glanz 4.49
Robert Ksiezak 4.31
James Holder 3.97
Guglielmo Franchetti 3.70
Jake Anderson 3.57
Ben Reade 2.08

Redcar

Kevin Doolan 8.41
Aaron Summers 8.08
Ulrich Østergaard 8.05
Matěj Kůs 7.57
Justin Sedgmen 6.06
Carl Wilkinson 5.78
Max Dilger 5.41
Mark Jones 4.00
Jade Mudgway 3.39

Rye House

Charlie Gjedde 8.44
Jordan Frampton 7.38
Anders Mellgren 7.08
Luke Bowen 6.92
Jason Bunyan 6.39
Jason Garrity 5.94
Kasper Lykke 5.60
Ritchie Hawkins 5.48
Simon Lambert 4.93
Ben Morley 4.11

Scunthorpe

Josh Auty 8.79
Nick Morris 8.51
Thomas Jørgensen 7.42
David Howe 6.81
Ashley Birks 6.73
Michael Palm Toft 6.32
Tero Aarnio 6.12
Gary Irving 5.48
Jerran Hart 3.86

Sheffield

Richard Hall 7.49
Josef Franc 7.38
Ricky Wells 7.20
Emiliano Sanchez 6.81
Hugh Skidmore 6.60
Jo Haines 6.13
Chris Schramm 4.59

Somerset

Jason Doyle 10.15
Jesper Monberg 8.49
Sam Masters 8.15
Claus Vissing 7.61
James Wright 6.83
Kyle Newman 6.35
Alex Davies 6.15
Tom Perry 4.27

Workington

Adam Roynon 8.83
Richard Lawson 8.69
Rene Bach 8.67
Rusty Harrison 7.19
Kyle Howarth 6.85
Kenny Ingalls 6.32
Tero Aarnio 6.02
Gary Irving 5.52
Ashley Morris 3.91

See also
List of United Kingdom Speedway League Champions
Knockout Cup (speedway)

References

Speedway competitions in the United Kingdom
2012 in speedway
2012 in British motorsport
Speedway Premier League